The Carnival is a play by Thomas Porter performed at the Theatre Royal by His Majesties Servants in London in the spring of 1664 with some success. The play may be an adaptation of a Spanish original, though no specific source has been identified.

References

1664 plays
Plays by Thomas Porter